Dickvale is a small village in the town of Peru, in Oxford County, Maine, United States.

References

Villages in Maine
Villages in Oxford County, Maine